The rivière du Moulin is a tributary of chenal de l'Île d'Orléans, flowing in the municipality of Saint-Pierre-de-l'Île-d'Orléans, in the L'Île-d'Orléans Regional County Municipality, in the administrative region of Capitale-Nationale, in the province of Quebec, in Canada.

The lower part of this small valley is served by Chemin Royale (route 368) which bypasses all of Île d'Orléans. Besides the area near the main road, agriculture is the main economic activity in this small valley.

The surface of the Moulin river is generally frozen from the beginning of December until the end of March, except the rapids areas; however, safe circulation on the ice is generally done from mid-December to mid-March. The water level of the river varies with the seasons and the precipitation; the spring flood occurs in March or April.

Geography 
The Moulin river takes an agricultural area in Saint-Pierre-de-l'Île-d'Orléans, south of a marsh area which is also drained on the north side by the rivière Pot au Beurre (île d'Orléans) and on the east side by a stream on the side of the Maheu River. This marsh straddles the boundary of the municipalities of Sainte-Famille-de-l'Île-d'Orléans and Saint-Pierre-de-l'Île-d'Orléans.

  to the southwest in an agricultural area with a slight drop, to route 368 (chemin Royal).

The Moulin river flows on the south bank of the chenal de l'Île d'Orléans (which is connected to the Saint Lawrence River) at the height of the village of Saint-Pierre-de-l'Île-d'Orléans. This mouth faces the center of the village of L'Ange-Gardien.

Toponymy 
The toponym "Rivière du Moulin" refers to a mill erected in the 17th century along its course, probably in the lower part. Three watercourses of this island are designated according to the existence of a mill built on their respective watercourse.

The toponym "rivière du Moulin" was formalized on August 8, 1977 at the Place Names Bank of the Commission de toponymie du Québec.

See also 

 Capitale-Nationale, an administrative region
 L'Île-d'Orléans Regional County Municipality (MRC)
 Île d'Orléans, an island
 Saint-Pierre-de-l'Île-d'Orléans
 Chenal de l'Île d'Orléans
 St. Lawrence River
 List of rivers of Quebec

Notes and references 

Rivers of Capitale-Nationale
L'Île-d'Orléans Regional County Municipality